The 2012 Mid-American Conference men's basketball tournament is the post-season basketball tournament for the Mid-American Conference (MAC) 2011–12 college basketball season. Third-seeded Ohio won the tournament received the MAC's automatic bid into the NCAA Men's Division I Basketball Championship tournament. There they defeated Michigan and South Florida before losing to North Carolina in overtime in the Sweet sixteen. DJ Cooper of Ohio was named the tournament MVP.

Format
The format for the conference tournament has been modified for this season. The new format seeds the tournament by rewarding the No. 1 and No. 2 seeds with a bye into the semifinal round, while the No. 3 and No. 4 seeds will receive a bye to the quarterfinal round. Seeding will be determined by winning percentage in conference games, regardless of division.  First round games will be played on campus sites at the higher seed.  The remaining rounds will be held at Quicken Loans Arena.

Seeds

Bracket

All-Tournament Team
Tournament MVP – DJ Cooper, Ohio

References

Mid-American Conference men's basketball tournament
Tournament
MAC men's basketball tournament
MAC men's basketball tournament
Basketball in Cleveland